Cours du Soir (Evening Classes) is a thirty-minute short film in which Jacques Tati demonstrates the art of mime to a group of enthusiastic students.  Amongst skits performed are those of a tennis player and a horse rider – sketches that initially brought Tati acclaim on music hall stages in the 1930s.  Nicolas Ribowski directed the short on the set of Playtime in 1966.

References

External links

French short films
1967 films
1960s French-language films
Jacques Tati
1960s French films